Dwarf cloud rat may refer to:
the genus Carpomys, especially:
Carpomys melanurus

Animal common name disambiguation pages